In the Jewish diaspora, a Jewish quarter (also known as jewry, juiverie, Judengasse, Jewynstreet, Jewtown, Juderia or proto-ghetto) is the area of a city traditionally inhabited by Jews. Jewish quarters, like the Jewish ghettos in Europe, were often the outgrowths of segregated ghettos instituted by the surrounding Christian authorities. A Yiddish term for a Jewish quarter or neighborhood is "Di yiddishe gas", or "The Jewish quarter." While in Ladino, they are known as maalé yahudí, meaning "The Jewish quarter".

Many European and Near Eastern cities once had a historical Jewish quarter and some still have it. The history of the Jews in Iraq is documented from the time of the Babylonian captivity c 586 BC. Iraqi Jews constitute one of the world's oldest and most historically significant Jewish communities.

Jewish quarters in Europe existed for a number of reasons. In some cases, Christian authorities wished to segregate Jews from the Christian population so that Christians would not be "contaminated" by them   or so as to put psychological pressure on Jews to convert to Christianity. From the Jewish point of view, concentration of Jews within a limited area offered a level of protection from outside influences or mob violence. In many cases, residents had their own justice system. When political authorities designated an area where Jews were required by law to live, such areas were commonly referred to as ghettos, and were usually coupled with many other disabilities and indignities. The areas chosen usually consisted of the most undesirable areas of a city. In the 19th century, Jewish ghettos were progressively abolished, and their walls taken down, though some areas of Jewish concentration continued and continue to exist. In some cities, Jewish quarters refer to areas which historically had concentrations of Jews. For example, many maps of Spanish towns mark a "Jewish Quarter", though Spain hasn't had a significant Jewish population for over 500 years.

However, in the course of World War II, Nazi Germany reestablished Jewish ghettos in Nazi-occupied Europe (which they called Jewish quarters) for the purpose of segregation, persecution, terror, and exploitation of Jews, mostly in Eastern Europe. According to USHMM archives, "The Germans established at least 1,000 ghettos in German-occupied and annexed Poland and the Soviet Union alone."

Europe

Austria
Hohenems: 
Salzburg: 
Vienna: Judenplatz (1280-1421); Leopoldstadt

Belarus
Dziatlava: Zhetel ghetto
Minsk: Minsk ghetto (appr. 100,000 Jews, local and deported from Austria, Germany and the Czech Republic, during the Second World War)

Belgium
Antwerp: Joods Antwerpen (35,000 Jews before 1940, 15,000 nowadays)

Czech Republic
Kolín: 
Prague: Josefov

France
Bordeaux: Saint-Seurin
Draguignan: La Juiverie de Draguignan (fr)
Lyon: La Juiverie de Fourvière and La Guillotière
Marseille: La Carrière-des-Juifs and Mont-Juif or Montjusieu
Paris: the Pletzl in Le Marais district
Les Josiols is a former Jewish quarter situated north of Mirabel-aux-Baronnies

Germany

Berlin:  and the 
Cologne:  
Frankfurt am Main: Judengasse
Hamburg: New Town, and Eimsbüttel (History of the Jews in Hamburg)
Hanau: 
Koblenz: 
Leipzig: Brühl)
Speyer: Jewish community of Speyer
Stuttgart: 
Trier: 
Worms Worms

Greece
Rhodes: La Juderia

Hungary
Budapest: Erzsébetváros

Ireland
Cork: "Jewtown" around Albert Road
Dublin: Portobello

Italy
Caltagirone: Iudeca (Giudecca)
Catania: Judeca Suprana, Judeca Suttana and Piano di Giacobbe
Enna: Iudeca (Giudecca)
Messina: Tirone and Paraporto
Naples: Giudecca
Padua: Paduan Ghetto
Palermo: Meschita and Guzzetta
Reggio Calabria: La Judeca (Giudecca)
Rome: Roman Ghetto
Syracuse — La Jureca (Giudecca)
Venice: Venetian Ghetto

Netherlands
Amsterdam: Jodenbuurt; Jodenbreestraat (until World War II); Buitenveldert (contemporary)

Poland
Kraków: Kazimierz
Warsaw: Muranów (during World War II, the Warsaw Ghetto)

Portugal
Belmonte: Judiaria
Castelo de Vide: Judiaria
Lisbon: Alfama and Judiaria
Oporto: Judiaria and Bairro de Monchique

Romania
Bucharest: Văcăreşti/Dudeşti

Spain
Ávila — Judería
Barcelona — Call
Bellpuig — Call
Besalú — Call
Caceres — Judería
Calahorra — Judería
Córdoba — Judería
Estella-Lizarra — Judería
Girona — Call Jueu de Girona
Hervás — Judería
Jaén — Judería
León — Judería
Monforte de Lemos — Judería
Oviedo — Judería
Palma de Mallorca — Call
 Majorca  – Call Jueu d´Inca
Plasencia — Judería
Ribadavia — Judería
Segovia — Aljama
Sevilla — Judería
Sos del Rey Católico — Judería
Tarazona — Aljama
Toledo
Tortosa — Call
Tudela — Judería
Valladolid — Aljama

Turkey
European Istanbul: Balat
Izmir: Karataş

United Kingdom
City of London: Old Jewry
Winchester: Jewry Street

Africa

Egypt
Cairo — Harat Al-Yahud Al-Qara’In and Harat Al-Yahud

Morocco
Casablanca
Fez — Mellah of Fez
Marrakesh — Mellah of Marrakesh
Tangier

Tunisia
Djerba island — El Ghriba
Tunis — Hara

Asia
China
Shanghai — Shanghai ghetto, a temporary Jewish refuge during World War II.

India
Kochi – Jew Town, traditional Cochin Jewish district and location of the spice market.

Lebanon
Beirut — Wadi Abu Jamil

Turkey
Asian Istanbul — Kuzguncuk
Izmir — Karatas

Iraq
Baghdad — History of the Jews in Baghdad
Sulaymaniyah – Jewlakan

Syria
Damascus  – Harat Al Yehud, a recently restored tourist destination popular among Europeans before the outbreak of the Syrian civil war where vacationers can stay in the neighborhood and beautified former homes of the completely vanished ancient Jewish community.

Americas
Argentina
Buenos Aires — Once

Brazil
São Paulo — Bom Retiro, Higienópolis
Venezuela
Caracas — San Bernardino, Los Chorros, Altamira, Los Caobos and Sebucán
Mexico
Polanco
United States
Boca Raton, Florida – There are over 175,000 Jewish people in southern Palm Beach County.
New York City – Williamsburg and Crown Heights in Brooklyn, (historically) the Lower East Side and parts of The Bronx. Northern New Jersey, Long Island, and Rockland County have been home to large Jewish populations since the 1940s and 1950s.
Pittsburgh – Squirrel Hill, with some spillover into bordering Greenfield, Regent Square, and Shadyside. 
Canada
Montréal, Québec – Mile-End/Outremont and Côte-des-Neiges/Hampstead/Snowdon, Côte-Saint-Luc, Saint-Laurent Boulevard
Toronto – The Ward was the original Jewish district in the 19th century followed by Kensington Market in the early to mid 20th century.

Other regions
In the Americas, Australia, New Zealand and South Africa there are a number of neighborhoods or small towns, generally in large cities or outlying communities of such, which are home to large concentrations of Jewish residents, much in the manner of old-world Jewish quarters or other ethnic enclaves, though without exclusive Jewish population.

References

External links
 A walk in the old Jewish Quarter of Pest

Jewish communities
Quarters (urban subdivision)